Perceval School is a private school in Chatou, Yvelines, France. Established in 1957, it uses the Steiner-Waldorf teaching style. It serves levels preschool (maternelle) through upper school (lycée).  it has about 400 students.

References

External links
 Perceval School 
 English information

Lycées in Yvelines
Schools in Yvelines
1957 establishments in France
Private schools in France
Educational institutions established in 1957
Waldorf schools